Hint and similar may refer to:

 Hint (musician), musician Jonathan James from Sussex, England
 Hint (SQL), a feature of the SQL computer language
 Hint Water, a beverage company from San Francisco, California
 Aadu Hint (1910–1989), Estonian writer
 Font hinting, a process for optimizing the rasterization of vectors
 Hints, Shropshire, a location in England 
 Hints, Staffordshire, a village in Staffordshire, England
 Motorola Hint QA30, a mobile phone introduced by Motorola

Acronyms
 Hierarchical INTegration, a computer benchmark
 Nord-Trøndelag University College (Norwegian: Høgskolen i Nord-Trøndelag)
 Health Information National Trends Survey